The Bank of Montreal Building, or Bank of Montreal, Government Street Branch, is an historic building in Victoria, British Columbia, Canada. Designed by architect Francis Rattenbury, the building was constructed in 1897.
  It is located on Government Street, at the entrance of Bastion Square, a few blocks north of the British Columbia Parliament Buildings and The Empress. This building currently hosts the Irish Times Pub.

See also
 List of historic places in Victoria, British Columbia

References

External links
 

1897 establishments in Canada
Bank of Montreal
Buildings and structures in Victoria, British Columbia
Commercial buildings completed in 1897